Andreas Ascharin (Andrey Aleksandrovich Asharin;  in Pärnu –  in Riga) was a Baltic German-Russian chess master.

Ascharin's father was Russian, his mother was from a Baltic German family. He read law in Dorpat (now Tartu). Between 1875 and 1879, he worked in Saint Petersburg as a journalist for the St. Petersburger Zeitung and the St. Petersburger Herold. He also played in local chess tournaments. In 1876 he won ahead of Mikhail Chigorin and Emanuel Schiffers. In 1877 he lost a match to Friedrich Amelung (+3 –4 =2). In 1878/79 he took sixth place (Chigorin and Simon Alapin won).

From 1879 he lived in Riga where he worked as a teacher of German language at a gymnasium, and a translator of Russian literature into German. Among others, he published Schach-Humoresken (Riga 1894). He was a president of the Riga Chess Club.

References

External links
 Andreas Ascharin at 365Chess.com

1843 births
1896 deaths
People from Pärnu
People from Kreis Pernau
Baltic-German people
Chess players from the Russian Empire
19th-century chess players